Beat of the Night is a 1979 disco single by Ohio-based, group Fever.  The single was the most successful of the group's three releases on the disco/dance chart. Along with the track, "Pump It Up", "Beat of the Night" hit number one on the disco chart for one week.  The single also peaked at number ninety-three on the soul singles.

Chart performance

References
 

1979 singles
1979 songs
Disco songs
Fantasy Records singles